Bərcan (also, Bardzhan and Byardzhan) is a village and municipality in the Yardymli Rayon of Azerbaijan.  It has a population of 200.  The municipality consists of the villages of Bərcan and Ləzir.

References 

Populated places in Yardimli District